Sabit Abdusalam (born 26 March 1994), known as Abdul'eziz Abdusalam until 2017, is a Chinese footballer currently playing as a forward for Cangzhou Mighty Lions.

Club career
On 3 April 2021, Sabit Abdusalam left Xinjiang Tianshan Leopard after making over a hundred appearances for them to join top tier club Cangzhou Mighty Lions.

Career statistics

Club
.

References

External links

1994 births
Living people
Chinese footballers
China youth international footballers
Association football forwards
China League One players
Chinese Super League players
Xinjiang Tianshan Leopard F.C. players
Cangzhou Mighty Lions F.C. players